Events in the year 1989 in West Germany and East Germany.

Incumbents

West Germany
President - Richard von Weizsäcker
Chancellor – Helmut Kohl

East Germany
Head of State – Erich Honecker (until 18 October), Egon Krenz (starting 18 October; until 6 December), Manfred Gerlach (starting 6 December)
Head of Government – Willi Stoph (until 13 November), Hans Modrow (starting 13 November)

Events
 Monday demonstrations in East Germany
 Die Wende and Peaceful Revolution

 10 - 21 February - 39th Berlin International Film Festival
 23 March - Germany in the Eurovision Song Contest 1989
 20 - 30 July - The World Games take place in Karlsruhe.
 19 August - Pan-European Picnic
 7 October - East German Republic Day Parade of 1989
 9 November - Fall of the Berlin Wall
 4 December - First citizens' occupation of a Stasi building

Births 

 January 9 - Stefan Reinartz, footballer
 January 20 - Kim Bui, German artistic gymnast
 March 9 - Patrick Hausding, German swimmer
 April 27
 Lars Bender, German footballer
 Sven Bender, German footballer
 September 1
 Bill Kaulitz, German singer, band Tokio Hotel
Tom Kaulitz, German musician,  band Tokio Hotel
 August 4 - Daniel Jasinski, German discus thrower
 August 21 - Cindy Roleder, German athlete
 September 13 - Thomas Müller, German football player
 September 28 - Raphael Holzdeppe, German pole vaulter
 December 10 - Maria Kurjo, German swimmer

Deaths
February 13 - Hans Hellmut Kirst, German novelist (born 1914)
February 26 - Alexander Golling, German actor (born 1905)
April 18 - Hilde Benjamin, German judge and politician (born 1902)
May 18 - Hermann Höcherl, German politician (born 1912)
May 23 - Karl Koch, German hacker (born 1965)
June 9 - Wolfdietrich Schnurre, German writer (born 1920)
July 20 - Erwin Sietas, German swimmer (born 1910)
September 14 - Hans Georg Rupp, German judge (born 1907)
October 24 - Alex Seidel, German weapons manufacturer (born 1909)
November 1 - Hoimar von Ditfurth, German physician and scientific journalist (born 1921)
November 30 - Alfred Herrhausen, German banker (born 1930)
December 8 - Max Grundig, German entrepreneur (born 1908)
December 31 - Gerhard Schröder, politician (born 1910)

See also
1989 in German television

References

 
Years of the 20th century in Germany
1980s in Germany
Germany
Germany